Frans Pointl (1 August 1933 – 1 October 2015) was a Dutch writer.

Pointl was born in 1933 in Amsterdam, the son of a Jewish mother and an Austrian father. During World War II he went in hiding. He only began publishing later in life; his debut, De kip die over de soep vloog ("The chicken that flew over the soup"), is a collection of autobiographical stories that also describe that time. The book was an instant success and earned him a nomination for the ECI Literatuurprijs.

He spent the last years of his life in a nursing home in Amsterdam but continued to write. His last book, De laatste kamer ("The last room"), was published in 2013. He wrote of longing for death: "Being old is a chronic disease. Every night before I go to sleep I hope to slip into eternity. I've already written my epitaph: 'Finally liberated from people'". Pointl died on 1 October 2015.

References

External links 
 Profile of Pointl at dnbl.org

Selected bibliography 
 

1933 births
2015 deaths
20th-century Dutch male writers
Writers from Amsterdam
Dutch people of Austrian descent
Dutch people of Jewish descent